Stratan is a common surname in Romania and Moldova that may refer to:
Andrei Stratan (born 1966), Moldovan politician
Cleopatra Stratan (born 2002), Moldovan singer
Cosmina Stratan (born 1984), Romanian journalist and film actress
Dmitri Stratan (born 1975), Soviet water polo forward
Pavel Stratan (born 1970), Moldovan singer
Valentina Stratan-Golban, Moldovan politician